Sandro Zurkirchen (born 25 February 1990) is a Swiss professional ice hockey goaltender who is currently playing for EHC Kloten of the National League (NL).

References

External links

1990 births
Living people
HC Ambrì-Piotta players
EHC Kloten players
Genève-Servette HC players
Lausanne HC players
HC Lugano players
Swiss ice hockey goaltenders
HC Thurgau players
HCB Ticino Rockets players
EV Zug players
Sportspeople from the canton of Schwyz